Nigeria has 774 local government areas (LGAs), each administered by a local government council consisting of a chairman, who is the chief executive, and other elected members, who are referred to as councillors. Each LGA is further subdivided into a minimum of ten and a maximum of twenty wards. A ward is administered to by a councillor, who reports directly to the LGA chairman. The councillors fall under the legislative arm of the local government, the third tier of government in Nigeria, below the state governments and the federal government.

Functions
The functions of local governments are detailed in the Nigerian constitution and include the following:
 Economic recommendations to the State
 Collection of taxes and fees
 Establishment and maintenance of cemeteries, burial grounds and homes for the destitute or infirm
 Licensing of bicycles, trucks (other than mechanically propelled trucks), canoes, wheel barrows and carts
 Establishment, maintenance and regulation of markets, motor parks and public conveniences
 Construction and maintenance of roads, streets, drains and other public highways, parks, and open spaces
 Naming of roads and streets and numbering of houses
 Provision and maintenance of public transportation and refuse disposal
 Registration of births, deaths and marriages
 Assessment of privately owned houses or tenements for the purpose of levying such rates as may be prescribed by the House of Assembly of a State
 Control and regulation of outdoor advertising, movement and keeping of pets of all descriptions, shops and kiosks, restaurants and other places for sale of food to the public, and laundries

List of LGAs

Abia State

 Aba North
 Aba South
 Aruppe
 Bende
 Ikwuano
 Isiala Ngwa North
 Isiala Ngwa South
 Isuikwuato
 Obi Ngwa
 Ohafia
 Osisioma
 Ugwunagbo
 Ukwa East
 Ukwa West
 Umuahia North
 Umuahia South
 Umu Nneochi

Adamawa State

 Demsa
 Fufure
 Ganye
 Gayuk
 Girei
 Gombi
 Hong
 Jada
 Lamurde
 Madagali
 Maiha
 Mayo Belwa
 Michika
 Mubi North
 Mubi South
 Numan
 Shelleng
 Song
 Toungo
 Yola North
 Yola South

Akwa Ibom State

 Abak
 Eastern Obolo
 Eket
 Esit Eket
 Essien Udim
 Etim Ekpo
 Etinan
 Ibeno
 Ibesikpo Asutan
 Ibiono-Ibom
 Ika
 Ikono
 Ikot Abasi
 Ikot Ekpene
 Ini
 Itu
 Mbo
 Mkpat-Enin
 Nsit-Atai
 Nsit-Ibom
 Nsit-Ubium
 Obot Akara
 Okobo
 Onna
 Oron
 Oruk Anam
 Udung-Uko
 Ukanafun
 Uruan
 Urue-Offong/Oruko
 Uyo

Anambra State

 Aguata
 Anambra East
 Anambra West
 Anaocha
 Awka North
 Awka South
 Ayamelum
 Dunukofia
 Ekwusigo
 Idemili North
 Idemili South
 Ihiala
 Njikoka
 Nnewi North
 Nnewi South
 Ogbaru
 Onitsha North
 Onitsha South
 Orumba North
 Orumba South
 Oyi

Bauchi State

 Alkaleri
 Bauchi
 Bogoro
 Damban
 Darazo
 Dass
 Gamawa
 Ganjuwa
 Giade
 Itas/Gadau
 Jama'are
 Katagum
 Kirfi
 Misau
 Ningi
 Shira
 Tafawa Balewa
 Toro
 Warji
 Zaki

Bayelsa State
 Brass
 Ekeremor
 Kolokuma/Opokuma
 Nembe
 Ogbia
 Sagbama
 Southern Ijaw
 Yenagoa

Benue State

 Ado
 Agatu
 Apa
 Buruku
 Gboko
 Guma
 Gwer East
 Gwer West
 Katsina-Ala
 Konshisha
 Kwande
 Logo
 Makurdi
 Obi
 Ogbadibo
 Ohimini
 Oju
 Okpokwu
 Oturkpo
 Tarka
 Ukum
 Ushongo
 Vandeikya

Borno State

 Abadam
 Askira/Uba
 Bama
 Bayo
 Biu
 Chibok
 Damboa
 Dikwa
 Gubio
 Guzamala
 Gwoza
 Hawul
 Jere
 Kaga
 Kala/Balge
 Konduga
 Kukawa
 Kwaya Kusar
 Mafa
 Magumeri
 Maiduguri
 Marte
 Mobbar
 Monguno
 Ngala
 Nganzai
 Shani

Cross River State
Cross River State is divided into the following LGAs.

 Abi
 Akamkpa
 Akpabuyo
 Bakassi
 Bekwarra
 Biase
 Boki
 Calabar Municipal
 Calabar South
 Etung
 Ikom
 Obanliku
 Obubra
 Obudu
 Odukpani
 Ogoja
 Yakurr
 Yala

Delta State

 Aniocha North
 Aniocha South
 Bomadi
 Burutu
 Ethiope East
 Ethiope West
 Ika North East
 Ika South
 Isoko North
 Isoko South
 Ndokwa East
 Ndokwa West
 Okpe
 Oshimili North
 Oshimili South
 Patani
 Sapele
 Udu
 Ughelli North
 Ughelli South
 Ukwuani
 Uvwie
 Warri North
 Warri South
 Warri South West

Ebonyi State

 Abakaliki
 Afikpo North
 Afikpo South (Edda)
 Ebonyi
 Ezza North
 Ezza South
 Ikwo
 Ishielu
 Ivo
 Izzi
 Ohaozara
 Ohaukwu
 Onicha

Edo State

 Akoko-Edo
 Egor
 Esan Central
 Esan North-East
 Esan South-East
 Esan West
 Etsako Central
 Etsako East
 Etsako West
 Igueben
 Ikpoba Okha
 Orhionmwon
 Oredo
 Ovia North-East
 Ovia South-West
 Owan East
 Owan West
 Uhunmwonde

Ekiti State

 Ado Ekiti
 Efon
 Ekiti East
 Ekiti South-West
 Ekiti West
 Emure
 Gbonyin
 Ido Osi
 Ijero
 Ikere
 Ikole
 Ilejemeje
 Irepodun/Ifelodun
 Ise/Orun
 Moba
 Oye

Enugu State

 Aninri
 Awgu
 Enugu East
 Enugu North
 Enugu South
 Ezeagu
 Igbo Etiti
 Igbo Eze North
 Igbo Eze South
 Isi Uzo
 Nkanu East
 Nkanu West
 Nsukka
 Oji River
 Udenu
 Udi
 Uzo-Uwani

Gombe State

 Akko
 Balanga
 Billiri
 Dukku
 Funakaye
 Gombe
 Kaltungo
 Kwami
 Nafada
 Shongom
 Yamaltu/Deba

Imo State

 Aboh Mbaise
 Ahiazu Mbaise
 Ehime Mbano
 Ezinihitte
 Ideato North
 Ideato South
 Ihitte/Uboma
 Ikeduru
 Isiala Mbano
 Isu
 Mbaitoli
 Ngor Okpala
 Njaba
 Nkwerre
 Nwangele
 Obowo
 Oguta
 Ohaji/Egbema
 Okigwe
 Orlu
 Orsu
 Oru East
 Oru West
 Owerri Municipal
 Owerri North
 Owerri West
 Onuimo

Jigawa State

 Auyo
 Babura
 Biriniwa
 Birnin Kudu
 Buji
 Dutse
 Gagarawa
 Garki
 Gumel
 Guri
 Gwaram
 Gwiwa
 Hadejia
 Jahun
 Kafin Hausa
 Kaugama
 Kazaure
 Kiri Kasama
 Kiyawa
 Maigatari
 Malam Madori
 Miga
 Ringim
 Roni
 Sule Tankarkar
 Taura
 Yankwashi

Kaduna State

 Birnin Gwari
 Chikun
 Giwa
 Igabi
 Ikara
 Jaba
 Jema'a
 Kachia
 Kaduna North
 Kaduna South
 Kagarko
 Kajuru
 Kaura
 Kauru
 Kubau
 Kudan
 Lere
 Makarfi
 Sabon Gari
 Sanga
 Soba
 Zangon Kataf
 Zaria

Kano State

 Ajingi
 Albasu
 Bagwai
 Bebeji
 Bichi
 Bunkure
 Dala
 Dambatta
 Dawakin Kudu
 Dawakin Tofa
 Doguwa
 Fagge
 Gabasawa
 Garko
 Garun Mallam
 Gaya
 Gezawa
 Gwale
 Gwarzo
 Kabo
 Kano Municipal
 Karaye
 Kibiya
 Kiru
 Kumbotso
 Kunchi
 Kura
 Madobi
 Makoda
 Minjibir
 Nasarawa
 Rano
 Rimin Gado
 Rogo
 Shanono
 Sumaila
 Takai
 Tarauni
 Tofa
 Tsanyawa
 Tudun Wada
 Ungogo
 Warawa
 Wudil

Katsina State

 Bakori
 Batagarawa
 Batsari
 Baure
 Bindawa
 Charanchi
 Dandume
 Danja
 Dan Musa
 Daura
 Dutsi
 Dutsin Ma
 Faskari
 Funtua
 Ingawa
 Jibia
 Kafur
 Kaita
 Kankara
 Kankia
 Katsina
 Kurfi
 Kusada
 Mai'Adua
 Malumfashi
 Mani
 Mashi
 Matazu
 Musawa
 Rimi
 Sabuwa
 Safana
 Sandamu
 Zango

Kebbi State

 Aleiro
 Arewa
 Argungu
 Augie
 Bagudo
 Birnin Kebbi
 Bunza
 Dandi
 Fakai
 Gwandu
 Jega
 Kalgo

Kogi State

 Adavi
 Ajaokuta
 Ankpa
 Bassa
 Dekina
 Ibaji
 Idah
 Igalamela/Odolu
 Olamaboro
 Omala

Kwara State

 Asa
 Baruten
 Edu
 Ekiti
 Ifelodun
 Ilorin East

Lagos State

 Agege
 Ajeromi-Ifelodun
 Alimosho
 Amuwo-Odofin
 Apapa
 Badagry
 Epe
 Eti Osa
 Ibeju-Lekki
 Ifako-Ijaiye
 Ikeja
 Ikorodu
 Kosofe
 Lagos Island
 Lagos Mainland
 Mushin
 Ojo
 Oshodi-Isolo
 Shomolu
 Surulere
   Aguda

Nasarawa State

 Akwanga
 Awe
 Doma
 Karu

Niger State

 Agaie
 Agwara
 Bida
 Borgu
 Bosso
 Chanchaga
 Edati
 Gbako
 Gurara
 Katcha
 Kontagora
 Lapai
 Lavun
 Magama
 Mariga
 Mashegu
 Mokwa
 Muya
 Pailoro
 Rafi
 Rijau
 Shiroro
 Suleja
 Tafa
 Wushishi

Ogun State

 Abeokuta North
 Abeokuta South
 Ado-Odo/Ota
 Ewekoro
 Ifo
 Ijebu East

Ondo State

 Akoko North-East
 Akoko North-West
 Akoko South-East
 Akoko South-West
 Akure North
 Akure South

Osun State

 Aiyedaade
 Aiyedire
 Atakunmosa East
 Atakunmosa West
 Boluwaduro
 Boripe
 Ede North
 Ede South
 Egbedore
 Ejigbo
 Ife Central
 Ife East
 Ife North
 Ife South
 Ifedayo
 Ifelodun

Oyo State

 Afijio
 Ibadan North
 Ibadan North-East
 Ibadan North-West
 Ibadan South-East
 Ibadan South-West
 Ibarapa Central
 Ibarapa East
 Ibarapa North
 Ido
 Irepo
 
 Ogbomosho North
 Ogbomosho South
 Ogo Oluwa
 Olorunsogo
 Oluyole
 Ona Ara
 Orelope

Plateau State

 Bokkos
 Barkin Ladi
 Bassa
 Jos East
 Jos North
 Jos South
 Kanam

Rivers State

 Abua/Odual
 Ahoada East
 Ahoada West
 Opobo/Nkoro

Sokoto State

 Binji
 Bodinga
 Dange Shuni
 Gada

Taraba State

 Ardo Kola
 Bali
 Donga
 Gashaka
 [[Gassol]
 Jalingo

Yobe State

 Bade
 Bursari
 Damaturu
 Fika
 Fune
 Geidam
 Gujba

Zamfara State

 Anka
 Bakura
 Birnin Magaji/Kiyaw
 Bukkuyum
 Bungudu
 Chafe
 Gummi

Federal Capital Territory
 Abaji
 Abuja Municipal Area Council

See also
 Lists of villages in Nigeria

References

 Local Government Areas In Nigeria By State: A comprehensive list of all local government areas (LGAs) in Nigeria and their respective states.

External links
 Postcodes.NG - comprehensive directory of LGAs, districts, and villages in Nigeria
 Postcodes.NG - map of LGAs with boundaries
 Nigeria Congress
 Online Nigeria
 Sustainable Urban Development and Good Governance in Nigeria
 Thomas Brinkhoff: NIGERIA: Administrative Division (interactive map), in www.citypopulation.de

 
Subdivisions of Nigeria
Local Government Areas
Nigeria 2
Local Government Areas, Nigeria
Nigeria geography-related lists
Local Government Areas of Nigeria